Sikandra Rao railway station is a small railway station in Hathras district, Uttar Pradesh. Its code is SKA and serves the town of Sikandra Rao. The station consists of two platforms, and falls under Izzatnagar railway division.

Trains

References

Railway stations in Hathras district
Izzatnagar railway division